Elections to Perth and Kinross Council were held on 1 May 2003, the same day as other Scottish Local Government elections and the Scottish Parliament Election.

This was the last election using 41 single member wards, in which the Scottish National Party won the most seats with 15.

Election Results

Ward results

References

2003
2003 Scottish local elections